Linda Sormin (born 1971, Bangkok, Thailand) is a Canadian artist known for her ceramics and installations. As a young girl  Sormin immigrated from Thailand to Canada. She attended Andrews University, Sheridan College, and Alfred University. She teaches at New York University. In 2011 her work was included in the exhibition Overthrown: Clay Without Limits at the Denver Art Museum. In 2013 she was selected one of the 5 partcipants in the RBC (Royal Bank of Canada) Emerging Artist People’s Choice Award competition held at the Gardiner Museum.  In 2018 She held a solo exhibition entitled Fierce Passengers at the Carleton University Art Gallery.  In 2021 Sormin was included in the exhibition No Boundaries: Contemporary Canadian Ceramics at Messum's London and Wiltshire locations. The same year her work was included in the exhibition Ceramics in the Expanded Field at the Massachusetts Museum of Contemporary Art.

Her work is in the collection of the Gardiner Museum and the Victoria and Albert Museum. Her piece, Ta Saparot (pineapple eyes), was acquired by the Smithsonian American Art Museum as part of the Renwick Gallery's 50th Anniversary Campaign.

References

1971 births
Living people
Linda Sormin
Canadian women ceramists
21st-century women artists